The 2022–23 El Dakhleya SC season is the club's 18th season in existence and the first season back in the top flight of Egyptian football. In addition to the domestic league, El Dakhleya will participate in this season's editions of the Egypt Cup and the EFA Cup.

Players

First-team squad

Transfers

In

Out

Pre-season and friendlies

Competitions

Overview

Egyptian Premier League

League table

Results summary

Results by round

Matches 
The league fixtures were announced on 9 October 2022.

Egypt Cup

EFA Cup

References

Dakhleya
2022 in African football
2023 in African football